L'Isle-Verte is a small municipality located along the south shore of the Saint Lawrence River, in the Rivière-du-Loup Regional County Municipality of the Bas-Saint-Laurent region, Quebec, Canada. The name of the village refers to Île Verte (French for "Green Island"), a nearby island that is not within its municipal boundaries. Village and island are joined by a seasonal ferry.

It is known for its lamb, fed in a salted marsh, a luxury product in Quebec. Its marshes along the Saint Lawrence River are a protected bird sanctuary part of the Baie de l'Isle-Verte Ramsar wetland.

On January 23, 2014, a major fire destroyed the Résidence du Havre, a home for the elderly, killing thirty-two residents.

Demographics
Population trend:
 Population in 2016: 1294 (2006 to 2011 population change: -11.9%)
 Population in 2011: 1469 (2006 to 2011 population change: 0.3%)
 Population in 2006: 1464
 Population in 2001: 1519
 2001 to 2006 population change: -3.6%
 Population in 1996: 1567 (adjusted for boundary change)
 Population in 1991: 1013

Private dwellings occupied by usual residents: 615 (total dwellings: 675)

Languages:
 English as first language: 0.8%
 French as first language: 98.8%
 English and French as first language: 0.4%
 Other as first language: 0%

Notable people
Charles Borromée Rouleau was born in L'Isle-Verte in 1840.

See also
 List of municipalities in Quebec

References

External links 

Site de la municipalité de L'Isle-Verte

Municipalities in Quebec
Incorporated places in Bas-Saint-Laurent
Designated places in Quebec